Theodore Wilbur Anderson (June 5, 1918 – September 17, 2016) was an American mathematician and statistician who specialized in the analysis of multivariate data.
He was born in Minneapolis, Minnesota. He was on the faculty of Columbia University from 1946 until moving to Stanford University in 1967, becoming Emeritus Professor in 1988. He served as Editor of Annals of Mathematical Statistics from 1950 to 1952. He was elected President of the Institute of Mathematical Statistics in 1962.

Anderson's 1958 textbook, An Introduction to Multivariate Analysis, educated a generation of theorists and applied  statisticians; it was "the classic" in the area until the book by Mardia, Kent and Bibby . Anderson's book emphasizes hypothesis testing via likelihood ratio tests and the properties of power functions: Admissibility, unbiasedness and monotonicity.

Anderson is also known for Anderson–Darling test of whether there is evidence that a given sample of data did not arise from a given probability distribution.

He also framed the Anderson–Bahadur algorithm along with Raghu Raj Bahadur, which is used in statistics and engineering for solving binary classification problems when the underlying data have multivariate normal distributions with different covariance matrices.

Awards and honors
He was awarded a Guggenheim Fellowship in 1946.

In 1949 he was elected a Fellow of the American Statistical Association.

He was elected a Fellow of the American Academy of Arts and Sciences in 1974.

He was a member of the Norwegian Academy of Science and Letters.

Anderson died in September 2016 at the age of 98 in Stanford, California after experiencing heart problems.

Selected bibliography

Books

Chapters in books

References

External links 

1918 births
2016 deaths
Scientists from Minneapolis
Columbia University faculty
Stanford University Department of Statistics faculty
Stanford University Department of Economics faculty
Fellows of the American Academy of Arts and Sciences
Fellows of the American Statistical Association
Fellows of the Econometric Society
Members of the Norwegian Academy of Science and Letters
Presidents of the Institute of Mathematical Statistics
Members of the United States National Academy of Sciences
Economists from Minnesota
Mathematical statisticians